The Violin Sonata No. 3 of Ludwig van Beethoven in E-flat major, the third of his Opus 12 set, was written in 1798 and dedicated to Antonio Salieri. It has three movements:

Allegro con spirito
Adagio con molta espressione - in C major
Rondo: Allegro molto

The work takes approximately 18 minutes to perform.

External links

Performance of Violin Sonata No. 3 by Corey Cerovsek (violin) and Paavali Jumppanen (piano) from the Isabella Stewart Gardner Museum
List of works by Beethoven with dates, keys and internal movement keys including for example that for opus 12/2.

Violin Sonata 03
1798 compositions
Compositions in E-flat major
Music dedicated to students or teachers